The 1974 Norfolk mid-air collision happened on 9 August 1974 at Fordham Fen, Norfolk, England when a Royal Air Force McDonnell-Douglas F-4M Phantom FGR.2 of No. 41 Squadron RAF (41 Sqn) collided with a Piper PA-25-235 Pawnee crop spraying aircraft. All three aviators were killed: the pilot and navigator of the Phantom and the pilot of the Pawnee. The Phantom pilot was a Royal Air Force Group Captain and station commander of RAF Coningsby. It was the first collision between a civil aircraft and a military fast jet in the United Kingdom low flying military training system.

Aircraft
The Pawnee registered G-ASVX was a single-engined single-seat crop spraying aircraft built in 1974. The Phantom serial number XV493 was a twin-engined two-seat, all-weather military strike/interceptor aircraft.

Accident
The Pawnee had departed earlier on 9 August 1974 from Southend Airport to a disused airfield at Broomhill, near Downham Market in Norfolk. Broomhill was used as a temporary base to refuel the aircraft and to load pesticide. The Phantom was following a standard low-flying route; the Pawnee pilot was aware that military low-flying routes were in the area but the exact routing was classified and not released by the military. The Pawnee disintegrated, while the Phantom, on fire and shedding parts of its structure, continued on its heading for a further  before it hit the ground inverted. All three aviators were killed: the pilot and navigator of the Phantom and the pilot of the Pawnee.

Investigation
Both aircraft were found to have been maintained correctly and were legally authorised for the flights. Farmwork Services, who had chartered the Pawnee, had informed the local police authority about their proposed operation and type of chemical to be used.

Investigation of the wreckage failed to determine if either had a working anti-collision light and it was only possible to determine the height of the accident by the use of eyewitness accounts. The investigation could find no evidence to suggest that either of the pilots had a medical problem or that either aircraft had any defect that would have contributed to the accident.

The rules of the air state that the Pawnee should have given way to the Phantom which was closing from the right. But it was accepted that at a closing speed of about  the time needed by the Pawnee pilot to assess the situation and execute a manoeuvre was minimal. It was also a requirement of the Phantom pilot to make sure that he did not collide with the Pawnee but clearly in this accident the lack of time was an element. Also the military aircraft had only just turned on to the heading and with the Pawnee 15° to his left the view may well have been obstructed by the Phantom's canopy frame.

While it accepted the need for the Royal Air Force to practise low level high-speed flying the investigation report was concerned about the lack of information on the military low-flying route available to civil pilots, particularly those involved with crop spraying, pipeline, and powerline inspection.

Cause
The investigation determined "The accident occurred because neither pilot saw the other aircraft in time to avoid collision. The 'see and be seen' principle was inadequate for preventing collision in the circumstances that existed. A significant feature which contributed to the accident was the absence of any system for co-ordinating military and civil low flying activities in the low flying areas and link routes."

Recommendations
The accident report made seven recommendations:
 That the location and vertical extent of the low flying areas and link routes should be made available.
 Private pilots should be alerted to the nature of military low flying activities and the need to avoid them.
An advisory service be provided to enable civil pilots to co-ordinate their activities with the military.
That civil aircraft involved in low flying activities should be painted as conspicuously as possible and fitted with high-power collision warning lights preferably strobe type. Also recommended that the military consider fitment of strobe type high-power collision warning lights to aircraft engaged in low level training.
The military review their need for airspace for low-level high-speed operations and withdraw any areas not needed.
That the rules of the air be amended to allow aircraft with the right of way to climb and if necessary pass over the other aircraft.

References

Aviation accidents and incidents in 1974
Aviation accidents and incidents in Norfolk
Accidents and incidents involving Royal Air Force aircraft
Norfolk Mid-air Collision, 1974
Low flying
Military history of Norfolk
Mid-air collisions
Mid-air collisions involving general aviation aircraft
Mid-air collisions involving military aircraft
McDonnell Douglas F-4 Phantom II
20th century in Norfolk
1974 in military history
August 1974 events in the United Kingdom
1974 disasters in the United Kingdom